O moço loiro (The Blonde Boy) is a novel written by the Brazilian writer Joaquim Manuel de Macedo. It was first published in 1845.

External links
 O moço loiro, the book

1845 Brazilian novels